Gator bait may refer to:

 Alligator bait, ethnic slur for African-Americans
 'Gator Bait, 1974 action thriller film 
 Gator Bait, airboat ride at Six Flags New Orleans
 "Gator Bait", cheer heard at University of Florida sporting events

Alligators and humans